The Datil-Mogollon Section is a physiographic section of the larger Colorado Plateau province, which in turn is part of the larger Intermontane Plateaus physiographic division. It is a transitional area between the Basin and Range Province and the Colorado Plateau Province. It is also a newly defined unit that includes the southern part of the area previously designated the Datil Section.

Geology
The Datil-Mogollon Section is located along the southeastern rim of the Colorado Plateau, in New Mexico and eastern Arizona.

West
Most of the Datil-Mogollon Section in Arizona is the White Mountain volcanic field. It is an extensive area covered with thick lavas and tuffs. There are also remnants of large stratovolcanoes, mainly composed of basaltic andesite. High tablelands are capped with tuffs, andesite, and basalt lavas, and volcanic-derived conglomeratic sandstones and mudstones.

South
It is surrounded by numerous smaller volcanic centers and volcanic necks with extensive lava-covered mesas and valleys to the south. The ancient lava flows extend southward into the Mexican Highlands section of the Basin and Range Province and consequently that border of the Colorado Plateau Province is ill-defined.

The principal structure of the southwestern Datil-Mogollon Section is the Mogollon Rim in Arizona.

East
The Datil-Mogollon Section is bounded on the east by basins of the Rio Grande rift, which are part of the Mexican Highland Section of the Basin and Range Province. Along the eastern edge of the Datil-Mogollon, the Mexican Highland extends northward along the Rio Grande depression to the Southern Rocky Mountains. The boundary between the depression and the uplifted Colorado Plateau is sharply defined by the westernmost faults of the depression. The transition has several large structural basins and block-faulted ranges.

North
To the north are other physiographic sections of the Colorado Plateau Province. From east to west they are the Navajo Section in New Mexico and Arizona, and the southeastern Grand Canyon Section.

See also
 Sections of the Colorado Plateau Province
 Basin and Range Province
 United States physiographic region

References

External links

Colorado Plateau
Physiographic sections
Regions of New Mexico
Regions of Arizona
Landforms of Catron County, New Mexico
Mogollon Rim
White Mountains (Arizona)
Plateaus of the United States
Plateaus of Arizona
Landforms of New Mexico